Artuur Peters (born 26 October 1996) is a Belgian canoeist. He competed in the men's K-1 1000 metres event at the 2016 Summer Olympics.

References

External links
 

1996 births
Living people
Belgian male canoeists
Olympic canoeists of Belgium
Canoeists at the 2016 Summer Olympics
Sportspeople from Limburg (Belgium)
European Games competitors for Belgium
Canoeists at the 2019 European Games
Canoeists at the 2020 Summer Olympics
21st-century Belgian people